Human Rights First (formerly known as the Lawyers Committee for International Human Rights) is a nonpartisan, 501(c)(3), international human rights organization based in New York City and Washington, D.C. In 2004, Human Rights First started its "End Torture Now" campaign. The organization also runs the Fighting Discrimination program which focuses on hate crime.

Board of Directors
Human Rights First is governed by a board of directors composed of 92 members, including a 30-person Board of Advocates and a 13-person Emeritus Board.

Members of the board include:

 Jay Carney, Global Head of Policy and Communications at Airbnb
 Sarah Cleveland, Professor of Human and Constitutional Rights Columbia University Law School
 Ben Jealous, Executive Director of the Sierra Club
 Kerry Kennedy, President of RFK Human Rights
 Robert A. Mandell, former Ambassador to Luxembourg; Chairman & CEO of Greater Properties, Inc. (Ret.)
 Carlos Pascual, Senior Vice President at IHS Markit
 Nazanin Rafsanjani, former head of New Show Development at Gimlet Media and Spotify
 Mona Sutphen, Senior Advisor at The Vistria Group

Pro Bono Legal Representation for Asylum Seekers
Human Rights First's pro bono legal representation program matches good lawyers with asylum-seekers who need help and would not otherwise be able to afford high-quality legal representation.

The organization helps asylum seekers living in the greater Washington D.C., New York City, Los Angeles, and Houston metropolitan areas who do not already have legal representation, cannot afford an attorney, and need help with a claim for asylum or other protection-based form of immigration status. The organization's New York and Houston offices can also help people who are seeking asylum from within a nearby immigration detention center.

Selected publications 

 The War Against Children: South Africa’s Youngest Victims, Desmond Tutu, 1986. 
Vigilantes in the Philippines: A Threat to Democratic Rule, Diane Orentlicher, 1988. 
Refuge Denied: Problems in the Protection of Vietnamese and Cambodians in Thailand and the Admission of Indochinese Refugees into the United States, Albert Santoli, 1989. 
Paper Laws, Steel Bayonets: Breakdown of the Rule of Law in Haiti, Elliot Schrage, 1990. 
Childhood Abducted: Children Cutting Sugar Cane in the Dominican Republic, Theresa A. Amato, 1991.

References

External links
Interview with Michael Posner from the U.S. Holocaust Memorial Museum
Interview with Tad Stahnke from the U.S. Holocaust Memorial Museum

Non-profit organizations based in New York City
Human rights organizations based in the United States